The Frieden Ministry was the government of Luxembourg between 29 March 1958 and 23 February 1959 until the death of Pierre Frieden. It was a coalition between the Christian Social People's Party (CSV), and the Luxembourg Socialist Workers' Party (LSAP).

Ministers

Formation 
When in January 1958, the Minister of Economic Affairs, Michel Rasquin, left the government and became a member of the Commission of the EEC, Joseph Bech wanted to profit from the ministerial reshuffle by giving himself a Secretary of State for Foreign Affairs to assist him. However, the LSAP, the coalition partner, opposed this idea. Bech also requested that the Grand Duchess allow him to resign as Prime Minister, as he found he could no longer fulfil this role efficiently while still carrying out his international responsibilities. Pierre Frieden, the longest-serving Christian Social minister, replaced him as head of government.

Policy 
A year before the election, the Frieden government had a limited margin for manoeuvre. Various pressure groups presented their demands to the government, especially the Farmers' Central and the unions. The Frieden government continued the policy of the preceding government, putting more emphasis on reforms in education and culture. The law of 7 July 1958 introduced a new training regime for teachers. Their secondary studies would be complemented by two years at the "Institut pédagogique". The law of 3 August 1958 created the "Institut d'enseignement technique". The law of 5 December 1958 gave a legal status to the National Library and the State Archives. Other reforms, such as those of the state museums and professional education, could not be completed due to the premature death of the Prime Minister. The continual growth of the number of pupils required the construction of new school buildings. In 1958, construction was started for a new school campus on Boulevard Pierre Dupong, of which the first completed building was that of the new Athénée. The government also pursued the modernisation of the country's infrastructure. On 10 July 1958, it signed an agreement with the German Land Rhineland-Palatinate on the development of a pumping station on the Our, near Vianden. To achieve this, a private company with some investment by the Luxembourgish State had been created in 1951, the Société électrique de l’Our (SEO). The signing of the agreement allowed construction t start on the hydroelectric plant. The pumping station started working in 1963.

Footnotes

References 
 

Ministries of Luxembourg
History of Luxembourg (1945–present)
1958 establishments in Luxembourg
1959 disestablishments in Luxembourg
Cabinets established in 1958
Cabinets disestablished in 1959